The Jameh Mosque of Darab is related to the Seljuq dynasty and is located in Darab, inside the city. It is the only mosque in Iran with four minarets.

Sources 

Mosques in Iran
Mosque buildings with domes
National works of Iran